The Rhythmic Gymnastics World Cup is a competition for rhythmic gymnastics sanctioned by the Fédération Internationale de Gymnastique (FIG). It is one of the few tournaments in rhythmic gymnastics officially organized by FIG, as well as the  World Championships (including the Junior World Championships), the gymnastics competitions at the Olympic Games and the Youth Olympics, and the rhythmic gymnastics events at the World Games. The World Cup series should not be confused with the Rhythmic Gymnastics Grand Prix series, which is neither officially organized nor promoted by FIG.

History
In 1983, FIG decided to hold a World Cup event in rhythmic gymnastics. The event was staged as an alternative to the World Championships, a tournament held, at the time, every four years. The World Cup aimed to bringing together elite gymnasts in all around competition and in apparatus finals. Standalone World Cup tournaments were staged in 1983, 1986 and 1990, and have been retroactively called World Cup Finals by the International Gymnastics Federation.

Taking inspiration from the Grand Prix series established in 1994, the FIG Executive Committee made the decision to revive the World Cup in 1999 as a series of tournament which served as qualification stages, over the course of two years, for a World Cup Final event. The different stages, sometimes referred to as World Cup qualifiers, mostly served the purpose to award points for individual gymnasts and groups according to their placement. These points would be added up after a period of two years in order to qualify a limited number of athletes for the biennial World Cup Final event.

Five World Cup Final events were staged in even years from 2000 to 2008. For example, the World Cup Final tournament in 2000 served as the last stage of a series of competitions through the 1999–2000 season. At the World Cup Final, gold, silver and bronze medals were awarded to individual athletes (in four different apparatuses) and groups (in two different routines) after a qualification phase and a final presentation. The World Cup Final format was kept until 2008; the International Gymnastics Federation has decided not to host a single, standalone World Cup Final event after the 2008 World Cup Final.

Since 2009 the World Cup is staged through a series of events held annually, as opposed to the biennial format adopted from 1999 to 2008, or the standalone event format adopted from 1983 to 1990.

Current format
The current format of the World Cup divides the tournament in a series of events staged annually. In each of the stages, the top three gymnasts or groups in each apparatus, as well as in the all-around competition, are awarded medals and prize money. The stages usually attract the best rhythmic gymnasts in the world, with a considerable number of medalists at the Olympic Games and the World Championships competing in each event. FIG may also allow federations to organize parallel events to the World Cup series, such as junior tournaments. These tournaments, however, are not official FIG competitions and are not considered part of the World Cup Series.

After each stage, gymnasts are awarded points according to their placement (not only in medal positions) in the all-around and each of the four apparatuses. Groups are also awarded points according to placement in the all-around competition and each of the two routines. After the last event of the World Cup series, the 3 or 4 best results at the World Cup stages count towards a ranking list. The same is true for the World Challenge Cup series. The individual gymnast (or group) with the highest number of points in each apparatus (or each routine) is then declared the winner of the World Cup series. A separate ranking also defines the winners in each apparatus (or each routine) of the World Challenge Cup series. Winners receive a cup at the end of the series.

Events

World Cup Final

There were eight Rhythmic Gymnastics World Cup Finals held between 1983 and 2008. On the first three occasions, 1983, 1986 and 1990, the World Cup was held as a stand-alone event. From 1999 to 2008, each World Cup Final was held in an even-numbered year following a two-year long series that served as the qualification stages for the final event. The first World Cup Final using this format, formally considered the Fourth World Cup Final, was staged in 2000, following the 1999–2000 series; the last World Cup Final took place in 2008, at the end of the 2007–08 series. World Cup Finals are no longer held for any of the FIG disciplines.

World Cup qualifiers
From 1999 to 2008, a series of World Cup qualifiers were staged. The top 3 gymnasts or groups in each apparatus at the qualifier events would receive medals and prize money. Gymnasts or groups that finished in the top 8 would also receive points that would be added up to a ranking which would qualify individual gymnasts for the biennial World Cup Final.

World Cup series
Since 2009, the World Cup has been competed as a series of events held in different countries throughout the period of one year. From 2009 to 2016, the Rhythmic Gymnastics World Cup events were divided into Category A events (reserved for invited athletes only) and Category B events (open to all athletes). The format of the World Cup series was changed in 2017, when it was divided into: 1) the World Cup series; and 2) the World Challenge Cup series. All of the World Cup and World Challenge Cup events are open to all athletes.

Hosts
A number of nations across three different continents have hosted the events, including the World Cup Finals, World Cup qualifiers, as well as the World Cup and World Challenge Cup stages from 1983 to 2023. Notably, the International Gymnastics Federation has never appointed nations from Africa, Oceania and South America as hosts of the World Cup or World Challenge Cup events.

All-time medal table
What follows is a table containing the total number of medals earned historically at the World Cup and World Challenge Cup events. Results accounted for include: 1) the eight editions of the World Cup Final from 1983 to 2008; 2) all of the stages from the World Cup series (including World Cup qualifiers from 1999 to 2008) up to 2023; and 3) all of the stages from the World Challenge Cup events, since 2017. Results from the 1999 and 2001 World Championships, events that counted points for the ranking in their respective years, have not been taken into account. Overall, the total number of nations is considerably smaller when compared to the number of nations which earned at least one medal at the Artistic Gymnastics World Cup circuit.

See also

 Artistic Gymnastics World Cup
 FIG World Cup
 List of medalists at the FIG World Cup Final
 Rhythmic Gymnastics Grand Prix

References

 
Recurring sporting events established in 1983
World Cup
Gymnastics rhythmic